Variegatic acid (3,3',4,4'-tetrahydroxypulvinic acid) is an orange pigment found in some mushrooms. It is responsible for the bluing reaction seen in many bolete mushrooms when they are injured. When mushroom tissue containing variegatic acid is exposed to air, the chemical is enzymatically oxidized to blue quinone methide anions, specifically chinonmethid anions. It is derived from xerocomic acid, which is preceded by atromentic acid and atromentin, and its genetic basis is unknown. In its oxidized form (due to the production of a second lactone ring) is variegatorubin, similar to xerocomorubin.

It was first isolated from Suillus variegatus. It has strong antioxidant properties, and a nonspecific inhibitory effect on cytochrome P450 enzymes. A total synthesis was reported in 2001 that uses a Suzuki cross coupling reaction. It was found antibiotically inactive against an array of bacteria and fungi using the disk diffusion assay at 50 μg. However, at similar concentrations it was found to inhibit swarming and (probably consequently) biofilm formation of Bacillus subtilis. In vitro data supports that this pigment is an Fe3+-reducant in Fenton chemistry during  the initial attack of dead plant matter as part of the brown-rot saprobic lifestyle.

Derivatives
Variegatic acid methyl ester, 3-O-methylvariegatic acid methyl ester, and 3,3',4,4'-tetra-O-methylvariegatic acid methyl ester are red-orange pigments found in Boletales.

See also
 Pulvinic acid
 Pulvinone
 Vulpinic acid

References

Biological pigments
Polyphenols
Furanones
Catechols
Carboxylic acids